The 2011 Nagoya Grampus season is Nagoya Grampus's 19th season in the J.League Division 1 and 30th overall in the Japanese top flight. They are the defending J.League champions. It also includes the 2011 J.League Cup, 2011 Emperor's Cup, and the 2011 AFC Champions League.

Players

Current squad
As of July 19, 2010

Out on loan

2011 season transfers

In:

Out:

Competitions

J.League

Results summary

Results by round

Results

League table

Super Cup

J.League Cup

Emperor's Cup

Notes
The original schedule was December 17 13:00 but changed due to Reysol's participation in 2011 FIFA Club World Cup.

AFC Champions League

Group stage

Notes
Note 1: Nagoya Grampus v Al-Ain postponed from 15 March 2011 to 12 April 2011 due to earthquake in Japan.

Round of 16

Squad statistics

Appearances and goals

|-
|colspan="14"|Players who appeared for Nagoya Grampus that left during the season:
|}

Goal Scorers

updated to 21/12/11

Disciplinary record

Team kit
These are the 2011 Nagoya Grampus kits.

|
|

References
2011 J.League Division 1 Fixture

Nagoya Grampus
Nagoya Grampus seasons